The Battle of Walk on July 8, 1657 between forces of Sweden commanded by Friedrich von Löwen on one side, and Russian forces led by stolnik Matvey Sheremetyev, who for the first time in his career commanded an army by himself, on the other side. The largest part of the Russian army disobeyed Sheremetyev and left the battle at the beginning, forcing him to rely on the 250 reiters of Colonel Denis Fonvizin, who played the key role in the breakthrough and allowed the rest of the army to escape. The Swedish forces won the battle, and according to their sources they defeated an army of 8,000 men, 32 standards, banners and other field declarations had been captured in the battle and 1,500 Russians were dead or wounded along with their commander Matvey Sheremetyev, who later died in captivity. However, a recent analysis of Russian 17th-century archive documents related to the battle demonstrates that the entire Russian force, most of which escaped, consisted of only 2,193 men, 353 additional troops failed to arrive in time, and even Tsar Alexis I in his correspondence expected his army to be no larger than 3,000, while the casualties included 108 killed, 28 wounded, 5 captured. The Swedish declaration has been criticized by Oleg Kurbatov, an expert in the Russian military history of the 17th century, as often tendentious and inaccurate in its description of the Russian army and having inflated numbers.

Before succumbing to his wounds in Swedish captivity, Sheremetyev had said that the task of his force was to force the Swedes to retreat either into Tallinn or Riga, to then loot and burn the land, creating a scorched earth buffer against the Swedes.

References

Conflicts in 1657
17th century in Estonia
Walk (1657)
Walk (1657)
1657 in Sweden
1657 in Russia